Dewair or Dawer is a village in Rajsamand district, Rajasthan, India. It has a population of 4480. It is located on National Highway 48 (India) (earlier designated National Highway 8), 40 km from Kumbhalgarh and 22 km from Deogarh.

This is the site of the Battle of Dewair (1582) in which Maharana Pratap defeated Mughal forces of Akbar and reclaimed the land that he had lost in the Battle of Haldighati, and the Battle of Dewair (1606) in which Amar Singh I fought Mughal forces of Jahangir. 

On 10 January 2012, a victory memorial commemorating the victory of Maharana Pratap at Dewair was inaugurated by the President of India, Smt. Pratibha Patil.

References 

Villages in Pali district
Battlefields